A Thousand Words may refer to:

 A Thousand Words (album), a 2008 album by Belgian Indie/Electronica artist Styrofoam
 A Thousand Words (film), a 2012 film starring Eddie Murphy
 "A Thousand Words", a 1997 song by Savage Garden
 A picture is worth a thousand words
 The Thousand Character Classic, a Chinese poem used as a primer for teaching Chinese characters to children

See also
 1000 Words (disambiguation page)